Lisa Barclay (born 7 June 1992) is a Canadian volleyball player. She is a member of the Canada women's national volleyball team and played for University of British Columbia in 2014. She was part of the Canadian national team at the 2014 FIVB Volleyball Women's World Championship in Italy.

Clubs
  University of British Columbia (2014)

References

1992 births
Living people
Place of birth missing (living people)
Volleyball players at the 2015 Pan American Games
Pan American Games competitors for Canada
Canadian women's volleyball players
Opposite hitters
UBC Thunderbirds women's volleyball players
Outside hitters